Edward Lewis may refer to:

Politicians
Edward Lewis (Devizes MP) (1650–1674), British MP for Devizes, 1669–1674
Edward Lewis (Radnor MP), British MP for Radnor, 1761–1768, 1769–1774 and 1775–1790
Edward Parke Custis Lewis (1837–1892), U.S. Ambassador to Portugal
Edward Norman Lewis (1858–1931), Canadian politician
Edward T. Lewis (politician) (1834–1927), member of the United States House of Representatives from Louisiana
Edward Lewis (Australian politician) (born 1936), member of the Victorian Legislative Council
Ed Lewis (Missouri politician), member of the Missouri House of Representatives 
Edward Zammit Lewis, Maltese politician

Sports
Ed Lewis (wrestler) (1891–1966), American wrestler best known as Ed "The Strangler" Lewis
Eddie Lewis (footballer, born 1935) (1935–2011), English footballer
Eddie Lewis (American soccer) (born 1974), former American soccer player
Eddie Lewis (footballer, born 1926) (born 1926), English footballer
Eddie Lewis (American football) (born 1953), former professional American football defensive back
Edward John Lewis (1859–1925), Welsh international rugby player
Edward M. Lewis (1872–1936), Welsh-born, American baseball pitcher, professor of English literature and academic administrator
Edward Lewis (cricketer) (born 1959), American cricketer of Antiguan origin

Music
Ed Lewis (musician) (1909–1985), American jazz trumpeter
Edward Lewis (Decca) (1900–1980), founder of Decca Records in 1929

Others
Edward T. Lewis (college president), college president, poet, educator
Edward B. Lewis (1918–2004), American geneticist and Nobel Prize winner
Edward Gardner Lewis (1869–1950), American promoter, publisher, and political activist
Edward J. Lewis (1937–2006), American businessman and real estate developer from Pittsburgh
Ed Lewis, British Committee of 100 signatory
Edward Lewis (filmmaker), American news photographer and documentary filmmaker who made films about African Americans for Million Dollar Productions
Edward Lewis (producer) (1919–2019), film producer
Edward Lewis (minister) (1831–1913), New Zealand bootmaker and Church of Christ minister
Ed Lewis (1914–1976), "Bim" from Jamaican double-act Bim and Bam
Edward Mann Lewis (1863–1949), U.S. Army officer
Edward Lincoln Lewis (1865–1938), Archdeacon of St Davids
Edward Augustus Lewis (1820–1889), Justice of the Supreme Court of Missouri

See also
Ted Lewis (disambiguation)
Eddy Louiss (1941–2015), French jazz musician